Brad Crawford may refer to:

 Brad Crawford (American football) (born 1955), American football player
 Brad Crawford (Canadian football) (born 1987), Canadian football defensive back